Manor Black is an American comic book series created by writers Cullen Bunn and Brian Hurtt and artist Tyler Crook, published by Dark Horse Comics.

Publication history
Following a few teasing images on Dark Horse's Twitter account, Manor Black was announced on April 4, 2019 as a four-issue miniseries. The story was announced as a "gothic soap opera," drawing inspiration from Dark Shadows, American Gothic, Hammer horror films, and Twin Peaks. Cullen Bunn and Brian Hurtt came up with the idea during the early days of working on The Sixth Gun together, but the project didn't come together until Tyler Crook came on board as artist. Crook added his own ideas, which helped Manor Black become more fully realized. For Crook, it was important for him to create a contrast between the mundane and the monstrous, so while a he did a lot of design work on the magical elements of the story, he spent a lot of time making the mundane word just as detailed, scouting locations and figuring out what the local architecture and trees in Georgia.

Though initially announced as a miniseries, there is a larger plan for more stories. A second four-issue miniseries, Fire in the Blood, came out in 2022 with Brian Hurtt on art with Tyler Crook on colors. In an interview after the Fire in the Blood came out, Bunn said he has outlines for eight more arcs.

Issues

Collections

Reception

Critical reception
The initial reception of Manor Black was universally positive. Comedian Patton Oswalt called the series "a keeper" after reading the first three issues in advance of the first issue's release. Stacy Baugher, reviewer for Major Spoilers, praised the creative team for working so seamlessly together, saying their collaborations were "among the most original and unique to be found in the industry." Nathan Simmons of Adventures in Poor Taste praised Crook's artwork and considered the dialogue the high point of the issue, noting how it captured the dynamics of small town police precinct and injected humor.

References

Dark Horse Comics titles
2019 comics debuts
Comics by Cullen Bunn